Yah-ta-hey is a census-designated place (CDP) in McKinley County, New Mexico, United States. As of the 2000 census, the CDP population was 580. The English name for this place is an approximation of a Navajo greeting, though the actual Navajo name means "like a devil", in reference to J.B. Tanner, who operated the trading post located here; the same name is used for Aneth, Utah, where Tanner also worked.

Geography
Yah-ta-hey is located at  (35.627018, -108.790430).

Demographics

As of the census of 2000, there were 580 people, 156 households, and 138 families residing in the CDP. The population density was 146.3 people per square mile (56.6/km). There were 180 housing units at an average density of 45.4 per square mile (17.6/km). The racial makeup of the CDP was 69.31% Native American, 16.21% White, 0.34% Asian, 8.10% from other races, and 6.03% from two or more races. Hispanic or Latino of any race were 16.90% of the population.

There were 156 households, out of which 51.3% had children under the age of 18 living with them, 59.0% were married couples living together, 24.4% had a female householder with no husband present, and 10.9% were non-families. 9.0% of all households were made up of individuals, and 1.9% had someone living alone who was 65 years of age or older. The average household size was 3.72 and the average family size was 3.91.

In the CDP, the population was spread out, with 37.6% under the age of 18, 10.9% from 18 to 24, 23.6% from 25 to 44, 23.1% from 45 to 64, and 4.8% who were 65 years of age or older. The median age was 27 years. For every 100 females, there were 95.3 males. For every 100 females age 18 and over, there were 93.6 males.

The median income for a household in the CDP was $51,023, and the median income for a family was $53,203. Males had a median income of $25,682 versus $26,184 for females. The per capita income for the CDP was $26,307. About 21.2% of families and 15.1% of the population were below the poverty line, including 10.9% of those under age 18 and 100.0% of those age 65 or over.

Education
It is in Gallup-McKinley County Public Schools.

Zoned schools are: Chee Dodge Elementary School in Yah-ta-hey, Chief Manualito Middle School in Gallup, and Gallup High School.

References

Census-designated places in McKinley County, New Mexico
Census-designated places in New Mexico
Populated places on the Navajo Nation